Wendy Simms (born May 22, 1972) is a Canadian professional racing cyclist.

Career highlights

External links

1972 births
Living people
Canadian female cyclists
Cyclo-cross cyclists